Aricia chinensis is a small butterfly found in the East Palearctic (Central Asia (mountains), Mongolia, West China, Central China, Northeast China, Korea)  that belongs to the lycaenids or blues family.

Description from Seitz

Above like astrarche but the fringes spotted. Beneath the reddish yellow submarginal band is neither interrupted nor proximally dentate, being edged with short  black lunules and standing somewhat farther away from the margin. In North China and Manchuria. — myrmecias Christ. (80 a) is a form from Turkestan with the macular band pale yellow instead of reddish yellow. In May, found on flowers of Centaurea.  The larva feeds on Leguminosae.

Subspecies

A. c. chinensis  Transbaikalia, Amur, Ussuri, NE.China
A. c. sibiricana (Kozhanchikov, 1928) South Siberia (West of Baikal)
A. c. myrmecias (Christoph, 1877) Turan

See also
List of butterflies of Russia

References

Aricia (butterfly)